Sitanadi Wildlife Sanctuary is located in Dhamtari District, Chhattisgarh, India. Sitanadi Wildlife Sanctuary is a famous tourist attraction which is frequented by wildlife enthusiasts throughout the year. The wildlife sanctuary was established in 1974 under Wildlife Protection Act of 1972. This sanctuary sprawls over an area of 556 km2 and has an altitude ranging between 327 and 736 m above the sea level. It is named after Sitanadi River which originates from this sanctuary and joins Mahanadi River near Deokhut. Sitanadi Wildlife Sanctuary is known for its lush green flora and rich and unique and diverse fauna and has great potential to emerge as one of the finest wildlife destinations in central India.

Teak and bamboo predominate among the vegetation. Animals include Tigers, Leopards, Flying Squirrels, Jackals, Four-horned Antelopes, Chinkara, Black Buck, Jungle Cat, Barking Deer, Porcupine, Monkey, Bison, Striped Hyena, Sloth Bear, Wild Dogs, Chital, Sambar, Nilgai , Gaur, Muntjac, Wild Boar, Cobra, Python among many others. The sanctuary is also a paradise for bird watchers, as over 175 species of birds can be seen here.

References

External links
 https://tripnetra.com/blog/sitanadi-wildlife-sanctuary-chhattisgarh
 http://www.tourism.cg.gov.in/wildlife/

Wildlife sanctuaries in Chhattisgarh
Dhamtari district
Protected areas of Chhattisgarh
Protected areas established in 1974
1974 establishments in Madhya Pradesh